J. B. Allen House may refer to:

J. B. Allen House (Chestnut Grove, Kentucky), listed on the NRHP in Shelby County, Kentucky
J. B. Allen House (Petoskey, Michigan), listed on the National Register of Historic Places in Emmet County, Michigan

See also
Allen House (disambiguation)